Shek Lau Po is a village in Tung Chung on Lantau Island, Hong Kong.

Administration
Shek Lau Po is a recognized village under the New Territories Small House Policy.

References

External links
 Delineation of area of existing village Shek Lau Po (Tung Chung) for election of resident representative (2019 to 2022)

Villages in Islands District, Hong Kong
Tung Chung